The Penters Chert is a Devonian geologic formation in the Ozark Plateaus of Arkansas.  The name was introduced in 1921 by Hugh Dinsmore Miser in his study of Arkansas.  Miser designated a type locality near the old Penters Bluff railroad station in Izard County, Arkansas, however, he did not assign a stratotype. As of 2017, a reference section has not been designated for this unit.

See also

 List of fossiliferous stratigraphic units in Arkansas
 Paleontology in Arkansas

References

Devonian Arkansas